Andre Bava Shinyashiki (born 11 June 1997) is a Brazilian professional footballer who plays as a forward for Major League Soccer club Charlotte FC. He was named the recipient of the 2019 MLS Rookie of the Year award as well as the 2018 men's soccer Senior CLASS Award, a national recognition awarded to the top men's collegiate senior in college soccer.

Career

Youth and college
Shinyashiki played early in his youth for the Brazilian youth club Pequeninos do Jockey. He then played high school soccer for the Montverde Academy in Florida. While at Montverde, he was named the Montverde Academy Soccer Tournament (MAST) MVP, earning All-Tournament Team honors and winning the MAST Golden Boot. Shinyashiki helped lead Montverde to an unprecedented 117-match unbeaten streak and national championships in 2013 and 2014.

Shinyashiki played in college for the University of Denver Pioneers. Entering the 2015 NCAA Division I men's soccer season, Shinyashiki was ranked the 79th best player in the nation of the high school class of 2015 by CollegeSoccerNews.com. TopDrawerSoccer.com had listed Shinyashiki on their All-American watch list. He finished his freshman season making 19 appearances, 16 of which were starts, and scored 5 goals. He finished the season being named the Summit League Newcomer of the Year.

During Shinyashiki's sophomore and junior years, he scored nine goals each season. During the 2016 season, he helped the Pioneers earn their first ever final-four (College Cup) appearance at the NCAA Division I Men's Soccer Tournament.

Shinyashiki's senior year began with him scoring 19 goals in 9 matches. He finished the season with 28 goals in 21 matches, setting the goals record for the 2018 NCAA Division I men's soccer season, and the most goals in a single NCAA college soccer season in 20 years, three behind Wojtek Krakowiak's 31 goals in 1998. Shinyashiki was listed as one of the runners-up for the Hermann Trophy and the TopDrawerSoccer.com National Player of the Year Award. His college career ended with him being awarded the Summit League Men's Soccer Offensive Player of the Year and the Senior CLASS Award for men's soccer.

Professional
From 2017 to 2018, Shinyashiki played in the Premier Development League with the Colorado Rapids U-23 team.

On 11 January 2019, he was selected by Colorado Rapids with the fifth pick of the 2019 MLS SuperDraft. On 2 March 2019, against the Portland Timbers, he scored his first professional goal in his debut to tie up the match in the 94th minute on a snowy pitch in blizzard conditions, with an ambient air temperature of 18° F (-8° C).

After his successful debut season with the Rapids, Shinyashiki was selected as the 2019 MLS Rookie of the Year. Shinyashiki had seven goals and three assists across 31 appearances (18 starts) in his rookie campaign. Shinyashiki established himself as an impact player for Colorado as the club compiled an unbeaten 5-0-3 record in regular season matches where he recorded either a goal or an assist.

Shinyashiki continued his success in 2020, starting 14 of Colorado's 19 matches, including the Rapids' first-round playoff loss. Shinyashiki scored four goals and added one assist in the last eight matches of the regular season. Shinyashiki was named to the MLS Team of the Week after scoring in Colorado's 3-1 win over Seattle Sounders FC in Week 22.

Career statistics

Club

Personal life
Shinyashiki's father Roberto is a Brazilian psychiatrist and author. Shinyashiki is of Japanese descent through his father and Italian descent through his mother. Shinyashiki is eligible to represent Brazil, Japan  and Italy in international soccer.

Honors
Individual
MLS Rookie of the Year: 2019
Senior CLASS Award: 2018

References

External links
 Denver profile
 
 
 

Living people
1997 births
Brazilian footballers
Brazilian people of Japanese descent
Brazilian people of Italian descent
Footballers from São Paulo
Association football forwards
Denver Pioneers men's soccer players
Colorado Rapids U-23 players
Colorado Rapids draft picks
Colorado Rapids players
Charlotte FC players
Colorado Springs Switchbacks FC players
USL League Two players
Major League Soccer players
USL Championship players
All-American men's college soccer players
Brazilian expatriate footballers
Expatriate soccer players in the United States
Brazilian expatriate sportspeople in the United States
Montverde Academy alumni